Nebulosa delicata is a moth of the family Notodontidae first described by James S. Miller in 2008. It is found in western Ecuador as far north as Chical (Carchi Province) on the Colombian border.

The length of the forewings is 10–12 mm for males and 11–13 mm for females. The outer third of the forewings is gray brown to dark gray, while the hindwings are almost entirely white.

Etymology
This is one of the smallest species of Dioptinae. The name, taken from the Latin word delicatus, applies to the moth's size and to its intricate wing pattern.

References

Moths described in 2008
Notodontidae of South America